Walston's tube-nosed bat (Murina walstoni) is a species in the vesper bat family Vespertilionidae, found in the Greater Mekong region of Southeast Asia, specifically the Đắk Lắk Province of Vietnam and the Koh Kong and Ratanakiri provinces of Cambodia. This species was discovered in northeastern Cambodia in the Van Sai Protected Forest. They have tube-shaped nostrils (hence the name) which assist them with their feeding.

Walston's bat is one of 126 new species found in the Greater Mekong region during 2011. There were two other tube-nosed bats found in Southeast Asia in 2011: Ashy-gray tube-nosed bat (Murina cineracea) and Beelzebub's tube-nosed bat (Murina beelzebub). All three species are small for bats and M. walstoni is small for a Murina bat. These three new tube-nosed bats were discovered by a team from the Hungarian Natural History Museum (HNHM) and Fauna and Flora International (FFI). All three of these bats live in tropical forests, making them endangered by deforestation.

It is named after Joe Walston, an expert on bats of Vietnam and Cambodia. Walston works at the Bronx Zoo in the Wildlife Conservation Society as the Executive Vice President for Global Conservation. The bat's dorsal fur is a medium brown and its ventral fur is white. This bat is small enough to fit in a person's hand, weighing . As of 2013, there are still few details known about them and their ecology and it is suspected there are many more species of bats yet to be discovered in the region.

Vespertilionid bats have many cryptic species. Eight new species were found in Southeast Asia between 2005-2009. The use of DNA technology has proved very useful in differentiating between the various species of Murina.

See also 

 Peters's tube-nosed bat
 Scully's tube-nosed bat

References

Further reading 
 
 
 
 
 
 
 

Murininae
Mammals of Cambodia
Mammals of Vietnam
Mammals described in 2011